Waikiki were a rock group from Sydney, Australia, consisting of sister and brother Juanita Stein (bass/vocals) and Joel Stein (guitar/vocals), and Glenn Moule (drums) and Jimmy (or Jimmeh) Brandon (guitar). A new bass player Brendan Picchio joined the band in early 2003, replacing Brandon, with Juanita Stein moving from bass to rhythm guitar. In August 2003, Joel Stein explained the impact Picchio had made on the group. He told Radio Adelaide's Hermione Gilchrist that the new bassist was "the missing piece to the puzzle", adding, "he's what we've been looking for since we started."

In early 2004 the group disbanded, moved to London and re-formed as Howling Bells. 

Waikiki released one album, I'm Already Home, in 2002. Their single, "Here Comes September", placed 36th on the 2002 Triple J Hottest 100 poll.  They released three further singles and a five-track EP.

Discography

Albums

Extended plays 
 Presents... (Liberation Music, 2000)

Singles

Compilation appearances 
 Hits from the Box: An Aristotles Box Compilation (MGM Distribution Australia, 2000) – "Bracelet"

References 

Australian rock music groups
Musical groups established in 2000
Musical groups disestablished in 2003
2000 establishments in Australia
2003 disestablishments in Australia
Musical groups from Sydney